Francesco Glorioso (29 June 1942 – 13 April 2022) was an Italian rower. He competed in the men's eight event at the 1964 Summer Olympics.

References

External links
 

1942 births
2022 deaths
Italian male rowers
Olympic rowers of Italy
Rowers at the 1964 Summer Olympics
Sportspeople from Palermo